Popoudina lemniscata is a moth of the family Erebidae. It was described by William Lucas Distant in 1898. It is found in Kenya, Lesotho, South Africa and Zimbabwe.

References

 

Spilosomina
Lepidoptera of Kenya
Insects of Lesotho
Lepidoptera of South Africa
Lepidoptera of Zimbabwe
Moths of Sub-Saharan Africa
Moths described in 1898